Bifunctional UDP-N-acetylglucosamine 2-epimerase/N-acetylmannosamine kinase is an enzyme that in humans is encoded by the GNE gene.

The bifunctional enzyme, UDP-N-acetylglucosamine 2-epimerase (UDP-GlcNAc 2-epimerase/N-acetylmannosamine kinase) regulates and initiates biosynthesis of N-acetylneuraminic acid (NeuAc), a precursor of sialic acids. UDP-GlcNAc 2-epimerase activity is rate-limiting for the biosynthesis of sialic acid and is required for sialylation in hematopoietic cells. The activity of the enzyme can be controlled at the transcriptional level and can affect the sialylation and function of specific cell surface molecules expressed on B cells and myeloid cells. Modification of cell surface molecules with sialic acid is crucial for their function in many biologic processes, including cell adhesion and signal transduction. Differential sialylation of cell surface molecules is also implicated in the tumorigenicity and metastatic behavior of malignant cells. Sialuria is a rare inborn error of metabolism characterized by cytoplasmic accumulation and increased urinary excretion of free NeuAc.

References

Further reading

External links
 
 
 GeneReviews/NCBI/NIH/UW entry on Sialuria